Sigismund Schulz Goldwater (February 7, 1873 – October 22, 1942) was a physician and hospital administrator.

Biography

Goldwater earned his medical degree in 1901, was appointed superintendent of Mount Sinai Hospital in 1903, and later its director in 1917. He also was named Commissioner of Health in New York City in 1914 by Mayor John Mitchel, and during his term he was criticized for trying to enact public health measures that, during the backdrop of World War I, were considered too closely related to German philosophies.

Dr. Goldwater consulted on hospital administration and construction, and was instrumental in the founding of the hospital complex on Roosevelt Island (known then as Welfare Island). The Welfare Hospital for Chronic Disease was renamed Goldwater Memorial Hospital shortly after he died in 1942. It merged with Bird S. Coler Hospital in 1996 to form Coler-Goldwater Specialty Hospital. The Goldwater Campus closed in 2010 to make way for the Cornell Tech campus, and the remainder of the facility was renamed NYC Health + Hospitals/Coler.

Awards

Fellow, New York Academy of Medicine (1908)

References 

1873 births
1942 deaths
Physicians from New York (state)
Commissioners of Health of the City of New York